The Farmer Wants a Wife is an Australian reality television series based on the British reality show Farmer Wants a Wife. The first eight seasons, hosted by Natalie Gruzlewski, aired on the Nine Network between 2007 and 2012, with a ninth season, hosted by Sam McClymont broadcast in 2016. A tenth season aired on the Seven Network when the series was revived for the second time in 2020.

In May 2015, the Nine Network announced the series would be revived for a ninth season. Hosted by Sam McClymont, it premiered on 1 February 2016. Nine chose not to further renew the show.

In October 2019, it was reported that the Seven Network had commissioned a new season of the show, on 23 October 2019, the series was officially confirmed for revival by Seven at their 2020 Upfronts. In December 2019, Natalie Gruzlewski announced she would be returning as series host. The tenth season began airing on 26 July 2020. The title dropped the leading 'The', giving the show the same name as the original British version.

In August 2020, the series was renewed by Seven Network for a second season for 2021, making it the 11th season all up, Gruzlewski returned as host. The eleventh season began airing on 4 July 2021. In July 2021, the series was renewed by Seven Network for a third season for 2022 (being that of the twelfth season overall) which began airing on 4 September 2022, with Gruzlewski as host. In October 2022, the series was renewed for a fourth season (13th overall) by Seven. In February 2023, it was announced Sam Armytage will co-host the series alongside Gruzlewski.

Series overview

Farmers

Eligible bachelors

First Series (2007)

Second Series (2008)

Third Series (2009)

Fourth Series (2009)

Fifth Series (2010)

Sixth Series (2011)

Seventh Series (2011)

Eighth Series (2012)

Ninth Series (2016)

Tenth Series (2020)

Eleventh Series (2021)

Twelfth  Series (2022)

Series ratings

First series (2007)

Second series (2008)

Third series (2009)

Fourth series (2009)

Fifth series (2010)

Sixth series (2011)

Seventh series (2011)

Eighth series (2012)

Ninth series (2016)

Tenth series (2020)

Eleventh series (2021)

Twelfth series (2022)

See also 
 International editions

References

External links 
 Official site (via Internet Archive)

Nine Network original programming
Seven Network original programming
2000s Australian reality television series
2007 Australian television series debuts
2012 Australian television series endings
2016 Australian television series debuts
2016 Australian television series endings
2020 Australian television series debuts
2000s Australian game shows
2010s Australian game shows
2020s Australian game shows
Television series by Fremantle (company)
Television series by Eureka
Australian television series based on British television series
Australian television series revived after cancellation
Australian dating and relationship reality television series
2010s Australian reality television series
2020s Australian reality television series
Works about farmers